The Second Great Chelsea fire was a conflagration that occurred on October 14, 1973, in Chelsea, Massachusetts. The fire burned , and was spread by strong winds and a lack of adequate water supply in the neighborhood of the fire.

The fire broke out in the "Rag Shop" District, made up of wood structured buildings and machine shops.  By the time the first alarm had been raised at 3:56 pm, the fire was well developed and by 4:01 pm it had jumped the street, rapidly engulfing six buildings that lay in its path. High winds made it impossible for the firefighters on scene to contain the fire as it grew in size to around 2 city blocks. Many engines and crews were forced to retreat at this time to avoid becoming trapped. 

A new defense position was aimed to take place at the corner of Maple and Summer Street, but the rapidly expanding fire soon overtook that position. At 4:12 it had jumped Maple Street and at 4:15 it had leaped another two blocks which forced firefighters back in another retreat. Around this time Chief Fothergill requested mutual aid from all surrounding areas. At 4:20 pm (24 minutes after the first alarm had been sounded) Fothergill notified Command that a Conflagration was in progress. At 4:30 pm the fire was raging out of control and now encompassed 5 blocks. A new strategic firefighting defensive position was set up on Everett Avenue, the only street in the area wide enough to act as a firebreak. Strong winds again prevented water from getting to the flames. Before a proper defense was set up, however, the fire leaped 150 feet over their heads and ignited the Emerald Autoworks facility. 

Due to its rapid size and growth, Chief Fothergill boarded a helicopter to direct operations from the sky. After crossing Vale Street, every one of its buildings was engulfed in 12 minutes. To avoid being trapped the Medford firefighters were forced to abandon one of their engines. A system of hoses and feeder lines from as far as a mile away were set up to relay water to the main lines as the water supply was inadequate from the start. At 5:30 pm the fire had surrounded the Engine 5 Fire Station, and even though there wasn't a single firefighting apparatus available to them, the firefighters refused to abandon the station. 

Heated columns of air rose hundreds of feet high creating massive amounts of fresh air the fire needed to sustain itself, which were drawn in at ground level and creating winds that reached approximately 50–100 mph, drove heavy debris through the streets, and endangered the safety of firefighters and the public. Carried by that wind, embers fell behind the backs of firefighters creating brush and spot fires. Soon, the radiating heat of the area had preheated buildings hundreds of feet from the fire until they reached ignition temperatures and spontaneously exploded. Lacking a common radio frequency, the mutual aid fire companies were initially unable to get communications from Chelsea Command. In order to fix this issue, those in critical sections of the fire were given portable radios on the Chelsea Fire Command frequency and relayed the information and instructions to their individual companies. 

In 120 minutes the fire engulfed 18 city blocks, and the firefighters were successfully able to mount a defense in front of the Williams School. From the helicopter, Chief Fothergill ordered an all out stand must be made from the school at 6:30 pm as it was their last chance to stop the fire. Deputy Capustand set up a heavy line and apparatus outside the school and firefighters with hand-lines manned the roof. Mobile teams of firemen operated behind the school to extinguish spot fires. 

Within 5 hours, 1,200 firefighters and 111 fire departments had responded to the call for assistance. Even once the fire was successfully contained, many worked throughout the night to put out the spot fires throughout the city. It was 3 days before the fire was finally fully extinguished. On October 15, 1973, Francis Sargent wrote a letter to President Richard Nixon saying: "Dear Mr. President, I am requesting that the City of Chelsea immediately be declared a federal disaster area. The city of Chelsea was swept by a fire yesterday  which consumed 18 city blocks including 200 buildings.  Over 1,100 people have been left homeless and 600 left jobless by this disaster. Emergency federal assistance is urgently needed."

Later calculations revealed that over 300 buildings had burned down.

References

Chelsea, Massachusetts
Fires in Massachusetts
1973 in Massachusetts
1973 fires in the United States
October 1973 events in the United States
Events in Suffolk County, Massachusetts